Barbara Woodell (May 25, 1910 – January 16, 1997) was an American film and television actress, born in Lewistown, Illinois.

Selected filmography

 Lady, Let's Dance (1944)
 The Mysterious Mr. Valentine (1946)
 Carnegie Hall (1947)
 Framed (1947)
 The Unsuspected (1947)
 I Shot Jesse James (1949)
 State Department: File 649 (1949)
 My Foolish Heart (1949)
 Stagecoach Driver (1951)
 Canyon Raiders (1951)
 Dead Man's Trail (1952)
 The Rose Bowl Story (1952)
 The Flaming Urge (1953)
 The Homesteaders (1953)
 The Great Jesse James Raid (1953)
 Westward Ho the Wagons! (1956) 
 Bullwhip (1958)

References

Bibliography
 Renzi, Thomas. Screwball Comedy and Film Noir: Unexpected Connections. McFarland, 2012.

External links

1910 births
1997 deaths
American film actresses
American television actresses
20th-century American actresses
People from Lewistown, Illinois